Hydnellum cumulatum is a tooth fungus in the family Bankeraceae. It was described as new to science in 1964 by Canadian mycologist Kenneth A. Harrison. The fungus is found in Kings County and Annapolis County, Nova Scotia (Canada), where it fruits singly, in groups, or is fused masses in stands of red pine (Pinus resinosa) and eastern hemlock (Tsuga canadensis). The fruitbody resembles that of H. diabolus, but lacks the acrid taste of that species. In 2009, H. cumulatum was reported from Sweden, having been previously misidentified as Hydnellum scrobiculatum.

References

External links

Fungi described in 1964
Fungi of Europe
Fungi of North America
Inedible fungi
cumulatum